Colt Justin David (born November 26, 1985) is a former American football placekicker who played one season with the Montreal Alouettes of the Canadian Football League (CFL). He played college football at Louisiana State University and attended Grapevine High School in Grapevine, Texas. He was a member of the 2007 LSU Tigers national championship football team and the 98th Grey Cup winning Montreal Alouettes.

Early years
David was a four-year letterman for the Grapevine High School, playing both football and soccer. He converted 27 of 36 field goal attempts during his prep career, with a long of 50 yards. He also played punter, averaging 43.7 yards per punt as a senior and setting a school record with an 81-yard punt.

College career
David played for the LSU Tigers from 2005 to 2008. 

One of the most prolific kickers in LSU history, finishing four years with the Tigers with a school-record 369 points … Connected on 54-of-72 field goals and 201-of-204 PATs during his career … Holds the LSU record for career points scored (369) and PATs (201)  … Holds LSU single-season marks for field goals (26 in 2007), field goals attempts (33 in 2007), points by kicking (141 in 2007) and total points (147 in 2007) … The 147 total points in 2007 is also an SEC single-season mark … Ranks second in school history in field goals (54) and third in field goals attempts (72) … Kicked 18 field goals of 40 yards or more during his career.

He was named First-Team All-SEC in 2007 and 2008.

Professional career
David was signed by the Montreal Alouettes of the CFL on June 11, 2010. He was named CFL Special Teams Player of the Week for week fifteen of the 2010 CFL season after going six for six on field goal attempts in his CFL debut in relief of an injured Damon Duval. The Alouettes won the 98th Grey Cup on November 28, 2010, defeating the Saskatchewan Roughriders by a score of 21 to 18.

References

External links
Just Sports Stats
College stats

Living people
1985 births
American football placekickers
Canadian football placekickers
American players of Canadian football
LSU Tigers football players
Montreal Alouettes players
Players of American football from Texas
People from Bedford, Texas
People from Grapevine, Texas